Putative polypeptide N-acetylgalactosaminyltransferase-like protein 3 is an enzyme that in humans is encoded by the WBSCR17 gene.

This gene encodes an N-acetylgalactosaminyltransferase, which has 97% sequence identity to the mouse protein. This gene is deleted in Williams syndrome, a multisystem developmental disorder caused by the deletion of contiguous genes at 7q11.23.

References

Further reading